Giles Corey is a musical project formed by Have a Nice Life member Dan Barrett. As of 2023, Barrett has released one studio album, two EPs and one live album under the Giles Corey name.

History
When speaking of his plans for the debut album, Barrett said "Giles Corey as a project started off very differently from where it ended. Initially, I was just wondering if I could write country and western songs, and sort of turn folk music into something that sounded like it came from me. I put restrictions on the kinds of instruments I could use, and so on. That kind of faded away as the record took on a life of its own" as well as "Giles Corey was meant to have no electronic instruments (though I broke that rule) and to be influenced by country music, and the songwriting style grew out of that". Barrett makes frequent use of sampling in the project.

The self-titled album, Giles Corey, was released on March 1, 2011 to critical acclaim. The album has been described as "a deeply, intensely dark album of inner turmoil". Alongside it, a book of the same name was released. The book is an exploration of fictional cult leader Robert Voor and Barrett's own stories of depression and suicide. It continues the story of the accompanying book to Deathconsciousness. It was described by Barrett as "an intensely personal, intimate portrait of depression". According to Samuel Rosean of Drowned In Sound the album was "highly indicative of the more lo-fi and emotional centric design of modern slowcore, predicting an almost full decade of spilling, unpretentious slowcore that was to come".

On August 25, 2012, they released their first extended play (EP), Deconstructionist. The EP, unlike the album, was solely ambient music, described by Barrett as "designed to induce trances, possession states, and out-of-body experiences". Barrett was inspired by "ritual trance" while making the EP. Musically, the EP is composed of binaural beats. Phill Cameron described the EP as "disconcerting racket" that "instead of feeling claustrophobic" feels "almost lonely; every sound echoes, as if in a huge space, and the constant pressure of electronic beats adds a sense of desperate urgency to the music. It's unsettling and uncomfortable." The EP was accompanied by a thirty-page primer. The second song, "Infinite Death" features a pitch shifted sample of Yale philosophy professor Shelly Kagan and discusses "our inability to properly imagine our own deaths." It was chosen by the Independent as the fourth most chilling song of all time. 

This release was followed by their second extended play (EP) released on 21 February 2013 titled Hinterkaifeck.

Lastly, it was followed by a live album, Live in the Middle of Nowhere, released February 27, 2013. The album was recorded at the Enemies List Home Recordings Warehouse in Meriden, CT and features accompaniment from Flenser labelmate Thom Wasluck, who played the keyboard on "Earthmover".

In 2020, Barrett was set to perform at the Roadburn Festival in Tilburg, Netherlands as Giles Corey in celebration of The Flenser's 10th anniversary. This performance would have been the first time project had been played as a full-band, with Have a Nice Life band member Tim Macuga accompanying him. Due to the coronavirus outbreak, the show was cancelled with much of the program set to be postponed to 2021. As of 2023, the band still has yet to perform.

Discography

Studio albums
Giles Corey (2011)

Extended play
Deconstructionist (2012)
Hinterkaifeck (2013)

Live album
Live in the Middle of Nowhere (2013)

References

External links
 "Giles Corey".  Giles Corey Bandcamp.  Retrieved October 31, 2019.

21st-century American musicians
American ambient music groups
Musical groups established in 2000
Rock music groups from Connecticut